The 2007 Preakness Stakes was the 132nd running of the Preakness Stakes thoroughbred horse race. The race took place on May 19, 2007. It was a photo finish between Curlin and Street Sense, which was won by Curlin by a head, the shortest margin of victory in Preakness history. The Maryland Jockey Club reported total attendance of 132,221, this is recorded as second highest on the list of American thoroughbred racing top attended events for North America in 2007. This figure represented a record attendance for The Preakness Stakes.

The winning time over a fast track was 1:53.46, then considered to be tied for the fastest time ever with the clocking of 1:53 (which can range from 1:53.40-1:53.59) set in 1985 by Tank's Prospect and tied in 1996 by Louis Quatorze. However, the current record for the race is 1:53.00, retroactively credited to Secretariat in 2012 after a timer malfunction in the 1973 Preakness Stakes.

Payout 

The 132nd Preakness Stakes Payout Schedule

 $2 Exacta: (4-8) paid $23.20
 $1 Trifecta: (4-8-7) paid $50.00
 $1 Superfecta: (4-8-7-9) paid $340.30

The full chart  

 Winning Breeder: Faris Farm Inc.; (KY)
 Final Time: 1:53.46
 Track Condition: Fast
 Total Attendance: 132,221 * (Preakness Record)

Preakness Stakes feature key prep races list

This list contains the current 2007 standings that leads to the Preakness Stakes race.

See also
 2007 Kentucky Derby
 2007 Belmont Stakes

References

2007
Preakness Stakes
Horse races in Maryland
Preakness Stakes
2007 in sports in Maryland